Isomerida amicta is a species of beetle in the family Cerambycidae. It was described by Francis Polkinghorne Pascoe in 1866. It is known from Colombia and Panama.

References

Hemilophini
Beetles described in 1866